Ethyl bromodifluoroacetate is an ester that can be used to introduce the CF2 group when synthesising chemical compounds. It is a clear to yellow liquid. It is an ester of bromodifluoroacetic acid and ethyl alcohol.

Formation 
Ethyl fluorosulfonoxydifluoroacetate can react  with sodium bromide (NaBr) to produce ethyl bromodifluoroacetate. And this reaction could happen in the solvent sulfolane. The reactions takes 12 hours at 100 °C with a yield of 31%.

Reactions

Ethyl bromodifluoroacetate, and other similar compounds containing a CF2 units can be generated using the Reformatsky reagent with aldehydes and ketones. This yields 2,2-difluoro-3-hydroxy esters. Also ethyl bromdifluoroacetate is considered to be a good compound in generation of compounds and for testing with other organic compounds like lactones, imines and other amino acids.

Reference

Ethyl esters
Difluoromethyl compounds
Organobromides